"Kryptonite" is the debut single of American rock band 3 Doors Down. It was originally released as a demo for local play by 97.9 WCPR-FM in Biloxi, Mississippi, then was picked up by several radio stations during November and December 1999 and was officially serviced to radio on January 18, 2000. The song first charted on the US Mainstream Rock Tracks chart, reaching number one for nine weeks, then hit number one on the Modern Rock Tracks chart for 11 weeks. It also reached number one on the Mainstream Top 40 chart for five non-consecutive weeks, number four on the Adult Top 40 chart, and number three on the Billboard Hot 100, the band's highest-charting single on the listing.

Composition and inspiration
The song was written by the band's vocalist and drummer, Brad Arnold, in a mathematics class when he was fifteen and was one of the first songs he ever wrote.

About the song's meaning, Arnold has said:
"That song seems like it's really just kind of like asking a question. Its question is kind of a strange one. It's not just asking, "If I fall down, will you be there for me?", because it's easy to be there for someone when they're down. But it's not always easy to be there for somebody when they're doing good. And that's the question it's asking. It's like, "If I go crazy, will you still call me Superman?" It's asking, "If I'm down, will you still be there for me?" but at the same time, "If I'm alive and well, will you be there holding my hand?" That's kind of asking, "If I'm doing good, will you be there for me? Will you not be jealous of me?" That's the basic question that song's asking, and maybe throughout the years of singing that song, I might have come up with more meanings for it than it actually might have originally had."

The band gave their demo tape to local Mississippi radio station WCPR-FM who started playing the EP version of "Kryptonite" and it became the No. 1 requested song on the station for over 15 weeks. The station's program director sent the song to manager Phin Daly who in turn showed it to Bill McGathy, his employer at In De Goot Entertainment. The band was booked in New York to perform a showcase at the CBGB music club. Daly told HitQuarters: "Once they got on stage and started playing, it was apparent the magic was in the music. So we moved to sign them."

Music video
Directed by Dean Karr and filmed in March 2000, the music video presents an old man who was a big-time action hero on 1950s TV. The scene cuts between the band hanging around on the roof of the apartments where the old man lives, spying on a man harassing a woman. When the man drags her away, the old man dons his superhero suit and follows. In between shots of the old hero chasing the bad guy and failing to protect himself against a group of goths, the band is shown playing in a club (the Cowboy Palace Saloon in LA) with several other elderly people dressed as caricatures of comic villains. Several of these people are seen riding a mechanical bull during the final chorus. The video comes to a close when the old man dives through the skylight and catches the bad guy off guard, possibly knocking him out by falling on top of him. The video ends with the old man smiling, giving a thumbs up to the camera, having successfully completed his mission.

Live performances
"Kryptonite" was first performed live in Pascagoula, Mississippi on January 15, 1997. As of April 1, 2019, it has been performed 493 times, making it the most performed song by 3 Doors Down.

Track listings

European CD single
 "Kryptonite" (LP version) – 3:56
 "Smack" (LP version) – 2:29

German CD single
 "Kryptonite" (LP version) – 3:56
 "Wasted Me" – 3:11
 "Life of My Own" (live from Atlanta) – 4:36
 "Kryptonite" (acoustic) – 3:49

European and Australian maxi-CD single
 "Kryptonite" (LP version) – 3:55
 "Wasted Me" – 3:11
 "Duck and Run" (LP version) – 3:52
 "Kryptonite" (video) – 3:53

Personnel
Personnel are taken from the US promo CD liner notes.
 Brad Arnold – vocals, drums, lyricist, composer
 Matt Roberts – lead guitar, rhythm guitar, composer
 Chris Henderson – rhythm guitar
 Todd Harrell – bass guitar, composer
 Paul Ebersold – producer

Charts

Weekly charts

Year-end charts

Decade-end charts

Certifications

Release history

See also
 Kryptonite
 Superman in other media
 Pocket Full of Kryptonite

References

1999 songs
2000 debut singles
3 Doors Down songs
Republic Records singles
Song recordings produced by Rick Parashar
Songs written by Brad Arnold
Songs written by Matt Roberts (musician)
Songs written by Todd Harrell
Superman music
Songs about fictional male characters